Eumelea genuina is a species of moth of the family Geometridae first described by Theodor Franz Wilhelm Kirsch in 1877. It is found in Papua New Guinea.

References

Desmobathrinae
Lepidoptera of Papua New Guinea